Into the Outlands is the second live performance album by world music and jazz fusion ensemble SXL, released in 1988 by Celluloid Records.

Track listing

Personnel 
SXL
Aïyb Dieng – percussion
Ronald Shannon Jackson – drums
Bill Laswell – bass guitar
SamulNori – percussion
L. Shankar – violin, voice

Technical
Robert Musso – producer
Robbie Norris – assistant engineer
Howie Weinberg – mastering

Release history

References

External links 
 
 Into the Outlands at Bandcamp

1988 live albums
SXL (band) albums
Celluloid Records albums
Enemy Records live albums
Albums produced by Robert Musso